Hazardia vernicosa is a Mexican species of shrub in the family Asteraceae. It has been found only in the state of Baja California in northwestern Mexico, specifically near El Rosario. It has not been found in the United States although one of the Mexican populations is less than 10 km ( miles) south of the international border.

The plant produces numerous  flower heads each head with 3-5 yellow disc flowers plus 3-5 ray flowers.

References

External links

vernicosa
Flora of Baja California
Endemic flora of Mexico
Plants described in 1889
Taxa named by Townshend Stith Brandegee